The 1970 Tulsa Golden Hurricane football team represented the University of Tulsa during the 1970 NCAA University Division football season. In their first year under head coach Claude "Hoot" Gibson, the Golden Hurricane compiled a 6–4 record, 3–1 against conference opponents, and finished in second place in the Missouri Valley Conference.

The team's statistical leaders included John Dobbs with 664 passing yards, Josh Ashton with 685 rushing yards, and Jim Butler with 245 receiving yards.

Schedule

References

Tulsa
Tulsa Golden Hurricane football seasons
Tulsa Golden Hurricane football